The House of Bona, or Bunić, is a noble family long established in the city of Dubrovnik.

History 
The origins of the family remain largely unclear, but according to the two oldest traditions, it originated from Kotor in Venetian Albania, or else from the town of Vieste in Apulia and Leck. The Almanach de Gotha enumerates it among the eleven oldest native families of the Republic of Ragusa, and members of the family were still living in the city in the 19th century. The family was influential and wealthy in the Republic, divided into several branches, and combined with other noble families from Dubrovnik by a series of marriages, which in turn gave rise to additional branches of the family. Their nobility was recognised by the Austrian Empire, which granted a member of the family the title of marquess.

The main branch of the family is still in existence, with its principal residence in the United States, but also a secondary residence and several businesses in Dubrovnik.

Notable members 
 Jan (Giovanni) Junta Bona (15th century), merchant from Venice, owner of Krakow saltworks and several villages in Małopolska.
 Serafin (Saro) Bona (15th century), theologian and writer, the personal adviser of King Matthias Corvinus
 Župan Bona (died 1464), builder and politician
 Jakov Bona (1469-1534), writer and poet, ambassador of the Republic to Pope Leo X. A syllogism of his works was published in Rome in 1526.
 Mihael (Miho) Bona (16th century), Latin, and Italian poet
 Ivan Bunić Vučić (1591 or 1592–1658), poet and writer, now recognized as one of the founders of Croatian literature.
 Nikola Bona (1635-1678), led the Republic after the disastrous earthquake of 1667, considered "father" of his country. Died a prisoner of the Ottoman rule in Bosnia, a state funeral was decreed in his honour, and a plaque was erected in the hall of the Grand Council of the Republic. Wrote in the Illyrian Herodias, and other compositions in Italian and Latin.
 Đivo Bona (18th century), student of Cardinal Giovanni Battista Tolomei. He was a poet and writer, remembered for translating plays from French into Croatian, as well as several poems of his own.
 Jero Frano Bona (18th century), bishop and writer
 Frano Bona (1669-1717), general, killed in Belgrade
 Luka Bona (1708-1778), lawyer and writer
 Eduard Bona-Bunić (1894–1944), Croatian Home Guard general
 Frano de Bona (1909–1991), recruited as a spy for the Abwehr during the Second World War but turned by the British Secret Intelligence Service (as Agent FREAK) as part of the Double-Cross System.

See also 
 Dalmatia
 Dubrovnik
 Post-Roman patriciates
 Republic of Ragusa

References

Sources

 Francesco Maria Appendini, Notizie istorico-critiche sulle antichità storia e letteratura de' Ragusei, Dalle stampe di Antonio Martecchini, Ragusa 1803
 Renzo de' Vidovich, Albo d'Oro delle famiglie nobili patrizie e illustri nel Regno di Dalmazia, Fondazione Scientifico Culturale Rustia Traine, Trieste 2004
 Simeone Gliubich, Dizionario biografico degli uomini illustri della Dalmazia, Vienna-Zara 1836
 Giorgio Gozzi, La libera e sovrana Repubblica di Ragusa 634–1814, Volpe Editore, Roma 1981
 Robin Harris, Dubrovnik, A History, 
 Konstantin Jireček, L’eredità di Roma nelle città della Dalmazia durante il medioevo, 3 voll., AMSD, Roma 1984–1986

Ragusan noble families